The fourth season of British science fiction television series Doctor Who began on 10 September 1966 with the First Doctor (William Hartnell) story The Smugglers and, after a change of lead actor (Patrick Troughton) part-way through the series, ended on 1 July 1967 with The Evil of the Daleks. For the first time, the entire main cast changed over the course of a single season (the only other occasion this has happened is during Season 21).

Only 10 out of 43 episodes survive in the BBC archives; 33 remain missing. No serials in this season exist in their entirety. However, The Tenth Planet, The Power of the Daleks, The Moonbase, The Macra Terror, The Faceless Ones and The Evil of the Daleks have currently had their missing episodes (twenty five in total) reconstructed with animation and subsequently have been released on home media.

Casting

Main cast 
 William Hartnell as the First Doctor
 Anneke Wills as Polly
 Michael Craze as Ben Jackson
 Patrick Troughton as the Second Doctor
 Frazer Hines as Jamie McCrimmon
 Deborah Watling as Victoria Waterfield

Season 4 was the first season of Doctor Who to feature a recast for the lead role of The Doctor, with Patrick Troughton portraying 'The Second Doctor' throughout the majority the season. This was following the departure of William Hartnell in episode eight.

The Doctor's primary companions for the season included Anneke Wills as Polly, Michael Craze as Ben Jackson, and Frazer Hines as Jamie McCrimmon. Wills and Craze had first appeared in the show during the final serial of Season 3, and Frazer Hines was introduced in episode 15, The Highlanders. Wills and Craze left the show during episode 36, part six of The Faceless Ones.

Unlike season 3, which had a number of short lived companions with only two 'regular' cast members, season 4 featured four leads, resembling the lineups of the first two seasons. 

In episode 38 (part one of The Evil of The Daleks), Deborah Watling was introduced as Victoria Waterfield; featured more prominently in the following season.

Serials 

Season 4 was produced by Innes Lloyd. Gerry Davis served as Script Editor, apart from the final four episodes of The Evil of the Daleks. Peter Bryant joined as associate producer for The Faceless Ones, and replaced Gerry Davis as script editor for the last four episodes of the season.

The Smugglers was the final serial to be produced during the third production block, but was held over to the start of Season 4.

The Tenth Planet introduced the Cybermen and the concept of Regeneration, which wouldn't be named so until Planet of the Spiders in 1974.

The Power of the Daleks was the first Dalek story to use the traditional ...of the Daleks title form. Of the nine subsequent Dalek serials, only Death to the Daleks from Season 11 was not named in this way. The naming convention for Dalek stories was first used in the revived series with "Evolution of the Daleks" in Series 3.

While each of the other seasons produced in black and white have at least two serials completely intact (all serials from the transition to colour onwards have surviving copies in the BBC archive), none of the nine serials from Season 4 are complete in the BBC archive, with four (The Smugglers, The Power of the Daleks, The Highlanders and The Macra Terror) each having all of their episodes missing; of the total of 43 episodes between "Episode 1" of The Smugglers and "Episode 7" of The Evil of the Daleks, only 10 are currently in the BBC archive. The most complete serial of the season, The Tenth Planet, is missing only its last episode; this serial, as well as The Power of the Daleks, The Moonbase, The Macra Terror, The Faceless Ones and The Evil of the Daleks have had their missing elements recreated with animated episodes using the original soundtrack. Animations for Season 5 serials The Web of Fear and Fury from the Deep have also been released. The fully animated serials are presented in both colour and black and white formats, while The Tenth Planet and The Moonbase animations are presented exclusively in black and white.

: Episode is missing

Production

During this season the title card for the series was changed for the first time, starting with The Macra Terror.

Missing episodes

Season 4 is notable for being the only season of Doctor Who from which not a single complete serial survives. The missing episodes are:

The Smugglers – All 4 episodes
The Tenth Planet – Episode 4 (of 4 total) (Animated recreation exists)
The Power of the Daleks – All 6 episodes (Animated recreations exist)
The Highlanders – All 4 episodes
The Underwater Menace – Episodes 1 & 4 (of 4 total)
The Moonbase – Episodes 1 & 3 (of 4 total) (Animated recreations exist)
The Macra Terror – All 4 episodes (Animated recreations exist)
The Faceless Ones – Episodes 2, 4, 5 & 6 (of 6 total) (Animated recreations exist)
The Evil of the Daleks – Episodes 1, 3 to 7 (of 7 total) (Animated recreations exist)

Home media

VHS releases

DVD and Blu-ray releases

In print

See also 
 List of Doctor Who episodes (1963–1989)

References

Bibliography 

 
 
 

1966 British television seasons
1967 British television seasons
Season 04
Season 04
4
4
Black-and-white British television shows